Liu Zheng (born August 1954) is a retired lieutenant general in the People's Liberation Army of China. He served as Deputy Head of the PLA General Logistics Department. In November 2014 he was placed under investigation by the PLA's anti-corruption agency.

Liu was a member of the 12th National People's Congress.

Life and career
Liu was born and raised in Yingkou, Liaoning. He graduated from PLA Second Artillery Engineering University, majoring in electronics and communication engineering. After college, he was assigned to the PLA General Logistics Department (GLD). Liu obtained the rank of major general in July 2006. In December 2009 he was promoted to become Chief of Staff of the GLD, a position he held until December 2012, while he was promoted again to become Deputy Head of the GLD. He attained the rank of lieutenant-general in August 2014. On January 15, 2015, the People's Liberation Army announced that he has been under investigation since December 2014 for "suspected legal violations".

References

1954 births
Living people
People's Liberation Army generals from Liaoning
People from Yingkou
Delegates to the 12th National People's Congress